Hamaxiella is a genus of flies in the family Tachinidae.

Species
 Hamaxiella brunnescens Mesnil, 1967

References

Tachinidae